In geometry, the truncated hexaoctagonal tiling is a semiregular tiling of the hyperbolic plane. There are one square, one dodecagon, and one hexakaidecagon on each vertex.  It has Schläfli symbol of tr{8,6}.

Dual tiling

Symmetry

There are six reflective subgroup kaleidoscopic constructed from [8,6] by removing one or two of three mirrors. Mirrors can be removed if its branch orders are all even, and cuts neighboring branch orders in half. Removing two mirrors leaves a half-order gyration point where the removed mirrors met. In these images fundamental domains are alternately colored black and white, and mirrors exist on the boundaries between colors. The subgroup index-8 group, [1+,8,1+,6,1+] (4343) is the commutator subgroup of [8,6].

A radical subgroup is constructed as [8,6*], index 12, as [8,6+], (6*4) with gyration points removed, becomes (*444444), and another [8*,6], index 16 as [8+,6], (8*3) with gyration points removed as (*33333333).

Related polyhedra and tilings 

From a Wythoff construction there are fourteen hyperbolic uniform tilings that can be based from the regular order-6 octagonal tiling. 

Drawing the tiles colored as red on the original faces, yellow at the original vertices, and blue along the original edges, there are 7 forms with full [8,6] symmetry, and 7 with subsymmetry.

See also 

 Tilings of regular polygons
 List of uniform planar tilings

References
 John H. Conway, Heidi Burgiel, Chaim Goodman-Strass, The Symmetries of Things 2008,  (Chapter 19, The Hyperbolic Archimedean Tessellations)

External links 

 Hyperbolic and Spherical Tiling Gallery
 KaleidoTile 3: Educational software to create spherical, planar and hyperbolic tilings
 Hyperbolic Planar Tessellations, Don Hatch

Hyperbolic tilings
Isogonal tilings
Semiregular tilings
Truncated tilings